Joy Osmanski is a South Korean-born American actress. She is best known for her wide range of comedic roles on the TV shows The Loop, Samantha Who?, True Jackson, VP and Devious Maids. Joy is also known for her recurring role on Grey's Anatomy, her voicing of the Failsafe AI in the video game Destiny 2 and Jing Harris in Duncanville.  Osmanski played Paula Brooks / Tigress in the DC Universe series Stargirl.

Career
Osmanski currently plays the recurring character "Maggie Tompkins" on the NBC show Save Me starring Anne Heche. She has also voiced "Julie" on the FOX animated show Allen Gregory, created by and also starring Jonah Hill. She has also starred as the recurring character "Winnie Hyde" in the unaired NBC series Next Caller created by Stephen Falk and also starring Dane Cook, Collette Wolfe and Jeffrey Tambor.

Osmanski had a guest starring position on the ABC sitcom Better Off Ted as Lucy and also guest starred on the FX TV series It's Always Sunny in Philadelphia as Jackie. She also had notable recurring roles on Samantha Who? as Tracy and on Grey's Anatomy as surgical intern Lucy. She was recurring on the sitcom True Jackson, VP as Ms. Park.

She has also appeared on the TV shows Good Job, Thanks!, Men of a Certain Age (as Lindsey), Dwelling (as Thai Lady), Chaos (as Unchin Song) and Numb3rs. She has also starred in the TV movies Family Album (as Holly Shapiro), Nathan vs. Nurture (as Lexi Miller), Five Year Plan (as Judy).

Osmanski has appeared in the feature films Fired Up! (as curious cheerleader) and Alvin and the Chipmunks: The Squeakquel (as airline rep). For independent films, Osmanski stars as Jinnie Park in Christine Yoo's film, Wedding Palace opposite Brian Tee, and also stars as Amy in Dave Boyle's films, Surrogate Valentine and Daylight Savings. She also stars as Mary in Dave Boyle's film, White on Rice. She also had a recurring role as Joy on Devious Maids. In 2017, she appeared in the Netflix comedy series Santa Clarita Diet.

Joy Osmanski has also provided the voice of the Failsafe AI, a non-playable character in Bungie's video game Destiny 2 alongside Nolan North, Lance Reddick, Nathan Fillion, and more.

Personal life
Osmanski was born in Seoul, South Korea and adopted by American parents. She does not know the identity of her birth parents, but a DNA test uncovered significant Japanese ancestry. She graduated from Principia College with a degree in creative writing and studio art, and from the University of California, San Diego with an MFA from the graduate acting program.

Filmography

Film

Television

Video games

References

External links

American adoptees
American television actresses
South Korean emigrants to the United States
Living people
Principia College alumni
University of California, San Diego alumni
American actresses of Korean descent
21st-century American actresses
Year of birth missing (living people)